Adelsdorf may refer to:
Adelsdorf, Bavaria
Adelsdorf, Saxony; see List of windmills in Saxony
Zagrodno (Adelsdorf), in Lower Silesia